Najma Hameed (18 March 1944 – 2 December 2022) was a Pakistani politician who served as a member of Senate of Pakistan from 2009 to 2021, representing Pakistan Muslim League (N).

Political career
Hameed was elected to the Senate of Pakistan as a candidate of Pakistan Muslim League (N) on reserved seat for women in 2009 Pakistani Senate election. She was the sister of Tahira Aurangzeb and was the aunt of Marriyum Aurangzeb.

Hameed was re-elected to the Senate of Pakistan as a candidate of Pakistan Muslim League (N) on reserved seat for women in 2015 Pakistani Senate election.

Personal life and death
Hameed died on 2 December 2022, at the age of 78.

References

1944 births
2022 deaths
21st-century Pakistani women politicians
Pakistan Muslim League (N) politicians
Pakistani senators (14th Parliament)
Politicians from Multan
Women members of the Senate of Pakistan